Matthew  Bryan-Amaning (born 9 May 1988) is a British-Ghanaian professional basketball player, who plays for AS Douanes of the Basketball Africa League (BAL). He has represented the Great Britain national team in international competition.

College career
Bryan-Amaning played four seasons for the University of Washington Huskies, during the 2010–11 season he averaged 16 points and 8 rebounds. Some of his best performances included 30 points against Arizona State on 22 January, 15 rebounds against Oregon State on 8 January and 4 steals and 7 blocks in a narrow 87–86 loss at Arizona on 19 February. Such performances led to Bryan-Amaning being named Pac-10's most improved player and first-team All-Pac-10. At the 2011 Pacific-10 Conference men's basketball tournament Bryan-Amaning helped the Huskies to their third Pac-12 tournament championship.

Professional career

NBA Summer League
Following graduation, Bryan-Amaning was touted as a late second-round pick in the 2011 NBA draft, but went undrafted and decided to begin his career in Europe. In 2012, he was a member of the New Orleans Hornets squad in the NBA Summer League, where he averaged 2.2 ppg and 2.2 rpg with a 75 FT%. In 2013, Bryan-Amaning was again asked to play in the NBA Summer League, this time with the Chicago Bulls. He averaged 3.2 ppg, 3.0 rpg and 1.6 bpg, including a 5-block outing against the Portland Trail Blazers. In July 2014, he joined the Portland Trail Blazers for the 2014 NBA Summer League.

Overseas
Bryan-Amaning began his professional career with Hacettepe Üniversitesi of the Turkish Basketball League after signing a one-year contract with the club in July 2011. He signed with the Serbian team Radnički Kragujevac for the 2012–13 season, where he averaged 8.2 points and 3.2 rebounds per game in the Adriatic League. In October 2013 he signed a short-term deal with his hometown club London Lions of the British Basketball League, after a deal with Korean side Anyang KGC fell through. On 29 October 2013 he signed with Olympique Antibes. He left them in April 2014, and moved to SO Maritime Boulogne of the LNB Pro B for the rest of the season. In September 2014 he signed a one-year deal with MHP Riesen Ludwigsburg of Germany. On 28 October 2014 he left Ludwigsburg after playing five games in Bundesliga and averaging 7.2 points and 2.8 rebounds per game. Three days later, he signed with Soles de Mexicali of the Mexican LNBP. On 20 May 2015 he signed with Soles de Santo Domingo of Dominican Republic for the 2015 LNB season. On 2 September 2015, he returned to Soles de Mexicali. In April 2016, he signed with San Lorenzo de Almagro of the Argentine Liga Nacional de Básquet. He helped them to win the league title. In August 2016, Amaning signed with Japanese club Rizing Fukuoka for the 2016–17 season. In August 2017, he signed with Boca Juniors of Argentina for the 2017–18 season. However, he never appeared in an official game for Boca Juniors. On 17 January 2018 he signed with Defensor Sporting Club of the Liga Uruguaya de Basketball.

In March 2020, Bryan-Amaning signed with Zamalek in Egypt to play in the 2020 BAL season. The season was however delayed due to the COVID-19 pandemic, causing him to leave without playing a game. On 13 September 2020 he rejoined the London Lions. However, Bryan-Amaning parted ways with the team on 13 October. On 13 November 2020 Bryan-Amaning signed a short-term deal with the Worcester Wolves of the British Basketball League (BBL), following his departure from the London Lions in pre-season.

In February 2023, Bryan-Amaning joined AS Douanes from Senegal for the 2023 BAL season.

British national team
Bryan-Amaning began his international career at Under-16 level with England in 2004, moving up to Under-18 level and then into the Under-20 ranks with Great Britain in 2008, where he was ranked fourth among all players in the European Championships in blocked shots with 1.6 per game, as well as 12th in scoring, including a 41-point haul against the Czech Republic.

Bryan-Amaning made his senior debut for Great Britain against Canada in 2010. His best performance for GB came at the 2011 London Invitational where he averaged 1.7ppg and 2.7rpg against strong international competition including Croatia, China and France.

See also
 List of foreign basketball players in Serbia

References

External links
 
 ESPN.com profile
 Eurobasket.com profile
 FIBA.com profile

1988 births
Living people
ABA League players
Basketball players from Greater London
Boca Juniors basketball players
British expatriate basketball people
British expatriate basketball people in Serbia
British expatriate basketball people in the United States
British men's basketball players
Hacettepe Üniversitesi B.K. players
KK Radnički Kragujevac (2009–2014) players
London City Royals players
Riesen Ludwigsburg players
Power forwards (basketball)
Rizing Zephyr Fukuoka players
Soles de Mexicali players
South Kent School alumni
Washington Huskies men's basketball players
AS Douanes basketball players